Benjamin W. Edwards (c. 1780–1837) was an American colonist in early Texas, and the leader of the Fredonian Rebellion. In 1837 he ran for governor of Mississippi, but died during the campaign. He was the brother of Haden Edwards. They both were the leaders of the Fredonian Rebellion in 1827.

External links
 

1780 births
1837 deaths